The 2011 London Marathon was the 31st running of the annual marathon race in London, England, which took place on Sunday, 17 April. The elite men's race was won by Kenya's Emmanuel Kipchirchir Mutai in a course record time of 2:04:40 hours and the elite women's race was won by Mary Jepkosgei Keitany, also of Kenya, in 2:19:19.

Mutai's win made him the fourth-fastest ever over the distance. Runner-up Martin Lel sprinted to the line to beat Patrick Makau Musyoki, completing a Kenyan sweep of the podium. Keitany became the fourth-fastest woman ever, while defending champion Liliya Shobukhova came second with a Russian record time (later annulled due to doping).

In the elite wheelchair racing marathon, Briton David Weir beat the defending champion Josh Cassidy to claim his fifth title at the event – the most in the history of the competition. London's 2009 women's wheelchair winner Amanda McGrory won her second title in a course record time of 1:46:31 hours.

In the under-17 Mini Marathon, the 3-mile able-bodied and wheelchair events were won by Robbie Farnham-Rose (14:22), Jessica Judd (15:38), Sheikh Muhidin (12:41) and Jade Jones (13:44).

A total of 163,926 people applied to enter the race, with 50,532 having their application accepted and 35,303 reaching the start line. Among those starters 34,688 runners, 22,427 men and 12,261 women, finished the race. A total of 35 Guinness World Records were set at the competition. The majority of the records were for completing the fastest race in a certain costume, but others included the fastest couple and fastest parent-child pairings. German Uli Killian solved 100 Rubik's Cube puzzles whilst completing the race. Steve Chalke, a Christian social activist, improved the record for the most funds raised for charity through a marathon run, raising £2.3 million for his Oasis Charitable Trust – beating his own record set at the previous year's race. The largest age group present at the race were men in their 30s, followed by men in their 40s. The joint-youngest runners were Michael Bennett and Helen Nutter, both taking part on their eighteenth birthdays (the minimum allowable age), while the oldest participant was 87-year-old Paul Freedman.

Going against the traditionally strict invitational criteria for the elite races, an additional nine Japanese women were a late addition to the field. A 9.0 magnitude earthquake and tsunami struck Tōhoku region of Japan meant that the Nagoya Women's Marathon (a qualifier for the 2011 World Championships) was cancelled and a sympathetic agreement between the London race organisers and the Japan Association of Athletics Federations resulted in London taking the role of the cancelled Nagoya race.

The 2011 London Marathon marked the last time that Dave Bedford acted as the sole race director, with Hugh Brasher (son of former runner Chris Brasher) joining Bedford in a joint role in 2012, and later taking full responsibility.

Results

Elite men

Original seventh place finisher Abderrahime Bouramdane of Morocco (2:08:42) was subsequently disqualified for doping.

Elite women

There were multiple retrospective doping disqualifications in the women's race. Original runner-up Liliya Shobukhova had her Russian record of 2:20:15 annulled. Tenth place Mariya Konovalova and fifteenth place Inga Abitova (both also of Russia) had their runs of 2:25:18 and 2:26:31 disqualified.

Wheelchair men

Wheelchair women

References

Results
Virgin London Marathon 2011 Results. London Marathon. Retrieved 2011-04-25.
Men's results. Association of Road Racing Statisticians. Retrieved 2020-04-25.
Women's results. Association of Road Racing Statisticians. Retrieved 2020-04-25.

External links

Official race reports

2011
London
Marathon
London Marathon